Union Station, also known as New Haven Railroad Station  or simply New Haven, is the main railroad passenger station in New Haven, Connecticut. It is the third such station in the city of New Haven, preceded by both an 1848 built station in a different location, and an 1879 built station near the current station's location. Designed by noted American architect Cass Gilbert, the present beaux-arts Union Station was completed and opened in 1920 after the previous Union Station (which was located at the foot of Meadow Street, near the site of the current Union Station parking garage) was destroyed by fire. It served the New York, New Haven and Hartford Railroad for the next five decades, but fell into decline following World War II along with the United States railroad industry as a whole.

The New Haven Railroad went bankrupt in 1961, and the station was transferred to the Penn Central Transportation Company along with the rest of the New Haven Railroad on January 1, 1969. Penn Central itself went bankrupt the next year, and the station building was closed in 1973 to cut costs, leaving only the under-track 'subway' open for passengers. The station was listed on the National Register of Historic Places on September 3, 1975, but it was almost demolished before being saved by the Northeast Corridor Improvement Project in 1979, which began work to rehabilitate the station building. Reopened after extensive renovations in early 1985, it is now the most important transportation hub in New Haven. In the 21st century, it is the busiest train station in the state of Connecticut by passengers served, as well as one of the most used stations of Amtrak's entire network.

The property is listed on the National Register of Historic Places as New Haven Railroad Station. Its significance is partly as an example of the work of Cass Gilbert, who also designed the Woolworth Building in New York and the U.S. Supreme Court Building. The restored building features interior limestone walls, ornate ceilings, chandeliers and striking stainless steel ceilings in the tunnels to the trains. The large waiting room is thirty-five feet high and features models of NYNH&HRR trains on the benches.

Located at the intersection of the Northeast Corridor and the New Haven–Springfield Line, the station serves a variety of train services, including Amtrak, CT Rail, Metro-North, and Shore Line East.

History 

The current Union Station is the third such station to exist in New Haven; the first station, designed by Henry Austin, was opened in 1848 by the New York and New Haven Railroad. It was replaced by a new station in a different part of the city in 1879, under the auspices of the New York, New Haven and Hartford Railroad. This station served passengers in the city until it burned down in May 1918. In 1920, the New Haven Railroad opened the present station near the site of the previous station.

Decline 
Following the Second World War, railroads faced increasing competition from airlines and automobiles, and passenger train service declined. The New Haven Railroad began to neglect the station's maintenance due to its own financial troubles. In 1973, the station was purchased from New Haven Railroad successor Penn Central by the Connecticut Department of Transportation. That same year, the station building was closed to passengers as a means of reducing expenses, leaving only the station platforms and the connecting tunnels in use.

Revival 
In 1982, the city of New Haven and the New Haven Parking Authority signed an agreement with the state of Connecticut to rehabilitate and reopen the station, along with improvements such as building a parking garage. A $28 million rehabilitation project began on March 28, 1983, with a combination of state and federal funding. Restoration included repairing the station's marble furnishings, repairing the large globe lights that hung from the ceiling, cleaning the walls and ceiling, and repairing and installing new wooden benches. With rehabilitation complete, the station building reopened to passengers in 1985. Since then, the station has been operated by the New Haven Parking Authority, while the station has been leased to the city of New Haven by the state government.

Current service

Amtrak

Amtrak runs frequent service through Union Station along the electrified Northeast Corridor rail line.

Some of these trains connect with Northeast Regional trains; other Northeast Regionals run through to Springfield from New York or vice versa. These through trains must change locomotives at New Haven, as the track north to Springfield is not electrified, unlike the Northeast Corridor. The locomotive change is from a Siemens ACS-64 for the electrified territory to a General Electric P40DC or P42DC for the non-electrified territory, or vice versa. Prior to 2000, when the Northeast Corridor was electrified all the way to Boston, all trains continuing north of Union Station had to change from diesel to electric power.

At New Haven, the Vermonter also has a P42DC diesel-electric locomotive added to the train.

Amtrak operates a yard on the west side of the tracks, next to the station building.

Because of United Airlines code sharing on select Amtrak trains between Union Station and its hub at Newark Liberty International Airport in the New York City area, Union Station is assigned the IATA airport code of ZVE.

New Haven Union Station is the busiest Amtrak station in Connecticut. The station is the tenth busiest Amtrak station in the country, boarding or detraining nearly two thousand passengers daily.

In March 2020, Vermonter service north of the station was suspended indefinitely as part of a reduced service plan due to the coronavirus pandemic. The Vermonter resumed its normal service on July 19, 2021.

Metro-North

Metro-North Railroad operates its New Haven Line from Union Station to Grand Central Terminal in New York City. The service is well patronized by commuters, despite the travel time of about  two hours.

Metro-North operates New Haven Yard on the east side of the tracks, opposite Amtrak's yard. Work is done here, as well as the storing of train cars and locomotives. Smaller yards are located in Bridgeport and Stamford.

CTrail
Two rail services run by the Connecticut Department of Transportation under the CTrail brand are based at New Haven. Service launched on June 16, 2018.

On April 20, 2020, the station became the indefinite western terminus for Shore Line East service, running on a limited schedule due to the coronavirus pandemic.

Buses and shuttles
CTtransit's New Haven Division provides bus service to the station on four routes. One is a free shuttle that connects Union Station to downtown and the New Haven Green for connections to the remainder of the CTTransit New Haven routes, only running on weekdays. Route 271 on the Kimberly Avenue route to Savin Rock and Milford also serves the station. Route 272 serves Union Station from downtown New Haven via South Church Street and returns to downtown New Haven. Route 278 is the Commuter Connection only on afternoon times connecting Shore Line East.

Other providers at Union Station are Greyhound, Megabus, Peter Pan, and the Yale University Shuttle.

Station layout 

The station has four high-level island platforms, which are used for service in both directions. The New Haven Line has nine tracks at the station. The northern platform is adjacent to Tracks 1 and 3 is usually served by Amtrak and can accommodate 8-car trains. The second platform from the north, adjacent to Tracks 2 and 4, is usually served by Amtrak and is 9 cars long. The second platform from the south is adjacent to Tracks 8 and 10, served by Metro-North, Shore Line East, and the Hartford Line, and can fit 7-car trains. The southern platform is adjacent to Tracks 12 and 14, usually serves Metro-North and Shore Line East, and can accommodate 8-car trains. Track 6, not adjacent to any platform in the center of the station, is used only by through trains or idling Shore Line East consists. There are no tracks 5, 7, 9, 11 and 13.

All tracks are connected by the stainless-steel tunnel with elevators and staircases leading onto the platforms, as well as escalators, a staircase, and an elevator leading to the tunnel itself. In 2015, LCD displays replaced a mechanical split-flap display departure board made by Solari di Udine. The split-flap display was donated to the Danbury Railway Museum in Danbury, Connecticut, to eventually be put on display.

On either side of the station, the Northeast Corridor merges into four tracks.

See also
National Register of Historic Places listings in New Haven, Connecticut

References

External links

Hartford Line – New Haven Union Station
Shore Line East – Union Station, New Haven
Station Building from Union Avenue from Google Maps Street View

All of the following are filed under Vicinity of Union Avenue and/or Cedar & Lamberton Streets, New Haven, New Haven County, CT:

New Haven
New Haven
New Haven Union
New Haven Union
Stations on the Northeast Corridor
New Haven
Buildings and structures in New Haven, Connecticut
Railroad stations in New Haven County, Connecticut
Transportation in New Haven, Connecticut
Railway stations on the National Register of Historic Places in Connecticut
New Haven
Historic American Engineering Record in Connecticut
National Register of Historic Places in New Haven, Connecticut
Railway stations in the United States opened in 1920
Cass Gilbert buildings
Transit centers in the United States